"Taking a Break from All Your Worries" is the thirteenth episode of the third season of the science fiction television series, Battlestar Galactica. The title is a line from the Cheers theme song, "Where Everybody Knows Your Name" (the working title for this episode, as revealed in Ronald D. Moore's podcast commentary for the episode "Rapture", was "Where Everybody Knows Your Name").

Plot

Gaius Baltar, now a prisoner aboard Galactica, sits in the brig and crafts a hanging noose from strips of fabric. Number Six encourages his decision to commit suicide, suggesting that he will soon find out whether he is a Cylon or not. Stirred from his sleep, Felix Gaeta heads down to the brig. He asks the guard permission to see Baltar, but he is refused entry without authorization. At that moment, Baltar hangs himself.

He awakens in a Cylon resurrection tank surrounded by copies of Six. Baltar is ecstatic to be alive as a Six welcomes him back from the dead. However, she quickly turns hostile, telling him he is not a Cylon. The Sixes begin to cut his flesh and attempt to drown him in the liquid. The scene, however, is one of Baltar's hallucinations, and he returns to reality as the guard pulls him down and administers mouth-to-mouth.

In the hangar bay, Apollo introduces Chief Tyrol to Joe's Bar, a newly established lounge separated from the rest of the hangar by a makeshift wall.

President Roslin and Admiral Adama sit with Dr. Cottle and Gaeta discussing Baltar's situation. Cottle feels that Baltar's hunger strike and the sleep deprivation imposed upon him aren't helping his mental state. Roslin wants to get information out of Baltar by any means necessary and orders Cottle to force feed him. Gaeta believes that Baltar trusts him and might talk to him but Adama thanks Gaeta for his help and tells him to leave the interrogation to himself and the President.

Apollo returns from the bar intoxicated and his wife Dee sits alone waiting for him. When she confronts him about their dissolving relationship, Apollo insists that he is still devoted to her and married her because he loves her. Dee sees their marriage as a lie and can only love Apollo as long as he and Starbuck allow it. Not wanting to argue any further, Apollo lies down and falls asleep.

Roslin visits Baltar in his cell. She apologizes for the force feeding and asks him again if he was involved in the Cylon sneak attack. Baltar refuses to incriminate himself and demands a trial by jury. Roslin orders Colonel Tigh to jettison Baltar out of an airlock. As they drag him away as he shouts that he is a citizen of the Colonies and entitled to a fair trial. While being dragged down "Memorial Hallway", Roslin allows Baltar to break free to pull down a photo from the board. He professes his innocence, saying the man in the picture was one of his closest associates and he was godfather to his child. He insists he would never do anything to hurt them. Roslin has Baltar returned to his cell.

Roslin is at a loss after her scare tactics fail. Tigh admits that Baltar is harder to break than he expected. Adama suggests that they administer a powerful hallucinogenic drug, the existence of which was classified. The drug induces fear of death, hopefully causing the subject to divulge secrets to a sympathetic interrogator as a survival mechanism. The drug's existence shocks Roslin but she approves its use.

Samuel Anders doesn't understand how Starbuck handled being manipulated into believing she had a hybrid child with Leoben Conoy back on New Caprica. He also questions Conoy's statements about Starbuck's special destiny. Starbuck remains uncertain herself and does not wish to discuss it any further. Anders tells her that if she really loves Apollo, she should go to him.

Baltar is strapped to a table in the sick bay and given the drug. He falls unconscious and his head is strapped down and then finds himself alone in utter darkness and floating in cold water. Baltar hears Adama's voice from the darkness asking him questions. Baltar tries to answer hoping to be saved from drowning. Under the effects of the drug he recalls the events back on Caprica during the attack—how Caprica Six saved his life by shielding him from the nuclear blast, and that he was an unwitting participant in the Cylons' plans.

Adama asks what the Cylons' interest was in the Eye of Jupiter and if they found the way to Earth. Baltar confesses they were there to discover the identities of the "final five", the unseen Cylons, wondering if he is a Cylon himself. Baltar now finds himself in a resurrection tank surrounded by figures who are revealed to be children, horribly disfigured and scarred with burns. Roslin asks Baltar what he sees and if he is a Cylon. Baltar responds "no" and falls back to unconsciousness. At this point, Cottle demands that the interrogation end as Baltar's vitals are falling. Adama and Roslin relent their questioning and allow Cottle to wake Baltar.

Elsewhere, Apollo and Starbuck have a moment alone to talk. Starbuck asks Apollo if he would be willing to leave Dee if she left Anders. Apollo can't give an answer, citing Starbuck's hasty marriage to Anders after her and Apollo's one-night-stand, to which Starbuck tells him to think about it since it's what he's best at. Apollo, with torn feelings between his wife and Starbuck, heads back to Joe's bar and drinks himself into a stupor. He leaves the bar inebriated, stumbling down a corridor and causing a scene after he trips and drops his wedding ring. He begins kicking containers open in a panic looking for his ring until he collapses in tears.

Meanwhile, Roslin and Adama decide to allow Gaeta to talk to Baltar, hoping he can get some useful information. Unknown to Baltar, a small camera has been installed in the ceiling of the brig to secretly record the conversation. In the cell, Gaeta asks Baltar to at least help him solve the navigation problems he's run into, suggesting to Baltar that if he cooperates he may get better treatment. Baltar looks over Gaeta's charts and begins by correcting his math. When Gaeta glances to the ceiling, Baltar becomes suspicious and notices the camera.

Baltar then accuses Gaeta of deceiving him. Gaeta is confused, but Baltar tells him he knew about his helping the resistance back on New Caprica. He allowed him access to documents knowing Gaeta would sneak them back to the very people who were working against him. Baltar grabs Gaeta's head, whispering something inaudible to the camera (later revealed in season 4 webisodes). Infuriated, Gaeta stabs Baltar in the neck with his pen.

Monitoring from another room, Roslin, Admiral Adama, Cottle and Tigh rush to the cell. Gaeta has Baltar in a stranglehold and is threatening to kill him. Roslin tells him to let Baltar go, saying she knows why Gaeta wanted the opportunity to talk with Baltar—so he could kill him. While Gaeta is distracted, Adama punches him in the face, knocking him unconscious. Baltar is checked out by Cottle, who has him taken to sickbay for the stab wound on his neck, which missed the artery.

Later at Joe's, Apollo sits with Dee while Starbuck and Anders sit at the bar. Apollo tries to reconcile his relationship with his wife, but periodically makes eye contact with Starbuck. Dee takes his hand and he tells her that he did not know what it meant to love her until he was going to lose her.

As Baltar recovers, Adama asks Roslin what she plans to do next. Roslin says Baltar will get his trial.

Added scene

The episode ends with a brief extra scene of Roslin confronting Number Six in her cell. (This scene is truncated in the broadcast, with the full scene made available on Sci-Fi's website at SyFy Video.

Roslin asks Six if she is willing to cooperate in testifying against Baltar in his upcoming trial. Six tells Roslin that she believes that she will be "airlocked" whatever she does. Roslin gives her word that this won't happen, but Six reminds Roslin that she once gave Leoben her word, and then airlocked him anyway. (The broadcast version ends here).

(In the web site version) Six goes on to say that if Baltar is given a fair trial, then she will be chief witness.

This scene can also be found on the DVD release for this episode, as a "Deleted Scene."

External links
 "Taking a Break from All Your Worries" at the Battlestar Wiki
 "Taking a Break from All Your Worries" at Syfy.com
 

2007 American television episodes
Battlestar Galactica (season 3) episodes

fr:Saison 3 de Battlestar Galactica#L.E2.80.99Interrogatoire